London Marriott Hotel Park Lane is a hotel in London, England. It is located at 140 Park Lane and is run by the Marriott Hotels group. The site was once occupied by Somerset House and Camelford House.

The hotel has 152 bedrooms all of which were refurbished, alongside the rest of the hotel, in 2015.

The site also occupies 138 Park Lane which was featured as a Home Guard Headquarters in the film The Life and Death of Colonel Blimp.

References

External links
Official site

Hotels in London
Marriott hotels
Hotel buildings completed in 1919